Home Valley may refer to:

Home Valley Station, a cattle station in Western Australia
Home Valley, Washington, an unincorporated community in the United States